Diomed, foaled in 1777, was an English Thoroughbred race horse who won the inaugural running of the Derby in 1780. He was subsequently a successful sire in the United States.

Racing years
A bright chestnut standing 15 hands 3 inches he was named after the Ancient Greek hero Diomedes. By the unraced Florizel out of the unraced Pastorella's Dam, aka Sister to Juno (both going back to the Godolphin Arabian, and Sister to Juno going back as well to the Darley Arabian), Diomed was bred by the Hon. Richard Vernon and owned by Sir Charles Bunbury, then trained by him at Hilton Hall.  He was started 19 times, winning 11 races, finishing second in 4, and third in 3.

Of these eleven wins, ten were consecutive, which included the inaugural running of The Derby in 1780.  During these early bright years of Diomed's life, he was considered by many to be the best colt seen in the Britain since Eclipse.

He was allowed to rest for a while, but when he was brought back to the races, he wasn't the same horse. Sometimes he would win, and sometimes he wouldn't win, and more often the latter than the former. His last win was a King's Plate in four mile heats carrying 168 pounds.

Retirement
Sir Charles retired Diomed to stud.  His fee was five guineas, or about $25.  (In England Diomed sired Grey Diomed who went to Russia where he was a great success, and also Young Giantess, who foaled Sorcerer and Eleanor.) There were few takers, and for the next decade or so, Diomed's fee went down and down until, by the age of 21, it was two guineas. By then, there were virtually no takers, so the old stallion did nothing but graze alone.

In the United States

Sir Charles offered Diomed for sale when the stallion was 21 years old.  Colonel John Hoomes of Bowling Green, Virginia bought him for $250, and then shipped him to Virginia where he was returned to stud in 1798.  Aside from importing bloodstock into the US, Hoomes also maintained his own racing stable and sizeable stud service in which his good friend, the leading national horseman of the time, John Tayloe III, was a partner.  Although Hoomes and Tayloe's English agent wrote Hoomes a letter stating very clearly that Diomed was "...a tried and true bad foal-getter," and strongly recommending he not be put to stud, they were unswayed.  Besides being personally impressed with the horse, a stallion of Tayloe's had also recently hurt himself, and Tayloe was in immediate need of a stud to replace him. Diomed went to work.

In those days, stallions did not stand in one place, but moved from stud farm to stud farm.  Diomed lived like this until he was thirty-one years old and was active to his final days.  His fee increased with his fame and his fame increased so quickly that Hoomes was able to sell a share in him for six times his purchase price soon after he landed on American soil.

Diomed, along with Medley, Shark, and Messenger, were the four most important stallions introduced into early American bloodstock.  Diomed's offspring competed with many of the greatest horses in American turf history: Haynie's Maria, who beat every horse she met until she was nine, and about whom Andrew Jackson said, "...Haynie's Maria can beat anything in God's whole creation," the undefeated Ball's Florizel (famous for his bad temper), Potomac, Duroc (sire of American Eclipse), and surely his greatest son of all, Sir Archy.  Sir Archy had a huge influence on Thoroughbred history, siring the line which led to Timoleon, Boston, and Lexington.
His descendants include Black Caviar, Phar Lap, Secretariat and American Pharoah. Furthermore, Diomed's influence has been felt through his sons regarding the development of the breeds American Quarter Horse (Sir Archy) and Standardbred (Duroc).

At Diomed's death at the age of 31, it was reported, "...there was as much mourning over his demise as there was at the death of George Washington."

Pedigree

 Diomed is inbred 4x4 to both the Godolphin Arabian and Partner which means that they appear twice in the fourth generation of the pedigree.

Sire line tree

Diomed
Centinel
Peacemaker
Stump-the-Dealer
Grey Diomed
Glaucus
Anthony
Sir Charles
Wrangler
Albemarle
Hamlintonian
Diomed (Darnaby)
Hamlintonian (Hancock)
Hamlintonian (Davis)
Randolph
Top Gallant
Truxton
Wonder
Tennessee Oscar
Columbus
Bolivar
Diomed (Lawrence)
Diomed (Ragland)
Diomed (Randolph)
Florizel (Ball)
Tuckahoe
Orphan
Florizel (Turpin)
Richmond
Enterprise
Vingt'un
Diomed (Kennedy)
Grey Diomed (Barksdale)
Eclipse
Monroe
Potomac
Little John
Sir Archy
Cicero
Sir Arthur
Director
Aratus
John Henry
Grey Archy
Spring Hill
Tecumseh
Young Sir Archy
Columbus
Warbler
Walk-In-The-Water
Timoleon
Washington
Marquis
Sir John Falstaff
Jackson
Boston
Arrow
Wade Hampton
Arlington
Cost Johnson
Ringgold
Commodore
Red Eye
Cracker
Big Boston
Jack Hawkins
Bob Johnson
Lecomte
Lexington
Piketon
Zero
Carolinian
Contention
Kosciusko
Pulaski
Clermont
Minor
Woodford
Romulus
Greybeard
Napoleon
Virginian
Byron
Mercury
Sidi Hamet
Berthune
Andrew Hamet
Sir Solomon
Thomas Big Solomon
Von Tromp
Rattler
Marylander
Sir Charles
Collier
Andrew
Count Zaldivar
Frank
Jim Bell
Wagner
Oliver
Voucher
Monte
Cary Bell
Ashland
Charley Ball
Wagner Joe
Jack Gamble
Red Jacket
Starke
Endorser
Joe Stoner
Neil Robinson
Rynodyne
Sir William
Childers
Roanoke
Grey Beard
Santa Anna
John Hancock
Muckle John
Sumpter
Almanzor
Brunswick
Henry
Robin Hood
Gerow
John Richards
Corsica
Stockholder
Pumpkin Boy
Tempest
Arab
Union
Bertrand
McDonough
Richard Singleton
Woodpecker
Grey Eagle
Bertrand Jr.
Hero
John Bascombe
Gauglion Gangle
Cherokee
Whalebone
Arnold Harris
Marion
Cymon
John Blount
Phoenomenon
Sir Richard
Sir William of Transport
Sir Leslie
Celestian
Gazan
Plato
Robin Adair
Gohanna
Occupant
Waxy
Pacific
Epsilon
Castor
Bill Alexander
Memnon
Saxe Weimer
Crusader
Sir Archy Montorio
Rodolph
Giles Scroggins
Industry
Goldboy
Merlin
Red Gauntlet
Tarriff
Hyazim
Wild Bill
Gandor
Copperbottom
Golddust
Rock
Rocket
Copperbottom (Captain Edwards)
Copperbottom (Rucker)
Longwaist
Zinganee
George Martin
Virginius
Muzzle Diomed
Duroc
Sir Lovell
Trouble
Marshal Duroc
Marshall Bertrand
American Eclipse
Forward
Goliah
Paul Clifford
Constellation
Orphan Boy
Lance
Mambrino
Druid
Eclipse (Monmouth)
Hornblower
Prospect
Godolphin
Medoc
Grey Medoc
Mirabeau
Sir Halpin
Bendigo
Blacknose
Cripple
Red Bill
Telamon
Bob Letcher
Shark
Mariner
Cadmus
Mingo
Tom Moore
Job
Sufferer
Ecliptic
Vincente Nolte
Zenith
Eclipse (Brawner)
Eclipse (Trimble)
St. Charles
Cock of the Rock
Romp
American Star
American Star 14
Star (Wallace)
Star (Lefevre)
Alpha
American Star (Wells)
Americus
Black Star
Brown Dick's Sire
Idaho
Jersey Star
Jim Waldron
Star (Carpenter)
Star (Goldsmith)
Walter Jones
American Star Jr
American Star 37
King Pharoah
Magnolia 68
Sir Henry
Star of Catskill
Star (Coleman)
Star 78
American Star Jr (Haven)
J K
Star (Fogg)
Gracchus
Rob Roy
Fredericksburg
Madison
Doublehead
Constitution

References

External links
 Diomed's pedigree, plus drawing

1777 racehorse births
1808 racehorse deaths
Racehorses bred in the Kingdom of Great Britain
Racehorses trained in the Kingdom of Great Britain
United States Champion Thoroughbred Sires
Epsom Derby winners
Thoroughbred family 6-b
Byerley Turk sire line